Brummer is a surname. Notable people with the surname include:
 Alex Brummer (born 1949), British journalist, editor, and author
 Carl Harald Brummer (1864–1953), Danish architect
 Clemens Brummer (born 1986), German figure skater
 Dieter Brummer (1976–2021), Australian actor
 Glenn Brummer (born 1954), American baseball player
 Joseph Brummer (1883–1947), Hungarian-born art dealer and collector
 Richard H. Brummer (born 1942), American politician and judge

See also
 Brümmer